Kohol (also Romanized as Kahal; also known as Kahūl, Kogul’, and Kūqūl) is a village in Rudqat Rural District, Sufian District, Shabestar County, East Azerbaijan Province, Iran. At the 2006 census, its population was 242, in 63 families.

References 

Populated places in Shabestar County